Street's Disciple is the seventh studio album by American rapper Nas, released as a double album by Columbia Records. Originally scheduled for a September 14, 2004 release, the album was ultimately released on November 30, 2004. Named after one of his lyrics from "Live at the Barbeque" by Main Source, the album's cover art was digitally created using photos of Nas to create an adaptation of The Last Supper. The album marked the end of Nas' tenure with Columbia Records after ten years.

Street's Disciple was well-received by critics and debuted at number 5 on the US Billboard 200, selling over 232,000 copies in its first week of sales. It was Nas's seventh consecutive platinum record in the United States, having shipped over 1 million copies in 2 weeks of release.

Production

Most of the album's production was handled between Salaam Remi, L.E.S. and Chucky Thompson of Sean Combs' production team The Hitmen. Remi contributed production on eleven tracks, L.E.S. produced on eight and Chucky Thompson helped on six. Salaam Remi (who collaborated with Nas on his previous LPs Stillmatic and God's Son) led all with nine solo productions. L.E.S. only produced three solo outings, but one included the single "Just a Moment". Thompson, on the other hand, had one solo production credit ("Getting Married").

Other notable producers from the album include A Tribe Called Quest member Q-Tip (who had last worked with Nas on Illmatics "One Love" and the remix of "The World Is Yours") and D.I.T.C. producer Buckwild ("These Are Our Heroes"). Nas himself produced "Suicide Bounce" and "U.B.R. (Unauthorized Biography of Rakim)", both from the second disc. L.E.S. also brought on baggage for his productions. T. Black and Nut assisted the legendary producer on "The Makings of a Perfect Bitch" and Herb Middleton helped with the beat on "Me &You (Dedicated to Destiny)". Chucky Thompson, too, brought in extra help for "Live Now" (Barnardo "Nardo" Williams). Rapper Ill Bill made a song similar to "U.B.R. (Unauthorized Biography Of Rakim)" titled "U.B.S. (Unauthorized Biography Of Slayer)" on his album The Hour of Reprisal (2008).

Music

Nas' father Olu Dara appears on the title track "Street's Disciple" and lead single "Bridging the Gap". Aside from Ludacris  ("Virgo") and Quan ("Just a Moment") no other MC's actually deliver a verse on Street's Disciple. Busta Rhymes plays hypeman to "Suicide Bounce" and Doug E. Fresh beatboxes on "Virgo". Kelis (Nas' ex-wife) helps sing the chorus along with the bridge on "American Way". The album has many guest singers, including: Amerie ("Rest of My Life"), Emily ("Reason"), Maxwell ("No One Else in the Room") and Keon Bryce ("War").  Nas also uses a voice synthesizer to make his voice high-pitched for his female alter-ego Scarlett, who appears on "Sekou Story" and "Live Now".

Street's Disciple features multiple socio-conscious and political songs, such as "A Message to the Feds, Sincerely, We the People", "American Way" and "These Are Our Heroes". The latter (originally titled "Coon's Picnic") contained attacks directed toward multiple black celebrities including: O. J. Simpson and NBA superstar Kobe Bryant. Another topic addressed by Nas were important women in his life or females in general. "Getting Married" is dedicated to his then-newlywed wife Kelis Rogers-Jones, "Me & You (Dedicated to Destiny)" is, aptly titled, directed toward Nas' daughter and "Makings of a Perfect Bitch" describes most men's idea of the ideal woman. Death and appreciating life are the subject to several songs as well such as "Live Now", "Rest of My Life" and "Just a Moment".

Release and reception

Street's Disciple was released by Columbia Records on November 30, 2004, to widespread critical acclaim. At Metacritic, which assigns a normalized rating out of 100 to reviews from mainstream publications, the album received an average score of 80, based on 16 reviews. Chicago Sun-Times writer Jeff Vrabel called it "sprawling and ambitious", while Robert Christgau from The Village Voice found its double-CD length "ambitious not hubristic, imposing not indigestible", and wrote that Nas "finally seems comfortable with his (black) humanity. He's responsible, thoughtful, and compassionate, never mealymouthed". He later named it the 11th best album of 2004 in his year-end list for the Pazz & Jop critics poll. Rolling Stone magazine's Jon Caramanica said it was "the rare instance of hip-hop old and wise enough to look backward without forgetting what it was like to look ahead with awe and wonder". Noah Callahan-Bever of Vibe was less enthusiastic, finding much of the songs "routine", suggesting Nas "needs new challenges, enlightening experiences, and careful insights to inspire him".

In the first week of its release, the album debuted at number five on the Billboard 200 and sold 232,000 copies in the United States. On November 18, 2005, it was certified Platinum by the Recording Industry Association of America (RIAA), having shipped one million copies. It was Nas's seventh consecutive platinum record in the US. "Bridging the Gap" was the album's only single to chart on the Billboard Hot 100, peaking at number 94.

Track listing
Credits adapted from the album's liner notes.

Sample credits
 "A Message to the Feds, Sincerely, We the People" contains samples from "Good Ole Music", written by George Clinton, performed by Funkadelic.
 "Nazareth Savage" contains excerpts from "I'm Gonna Love You Just a Little More Baby", written by Barry White, performed by Jimmy Smith.
 "American Way" contains samples from "Atomic Dog", written by George Clinton, Garry Shider, and David Spradley, performed by George Clinton.
 "Sekou Story" contains excerpts from "Take Me Just As I Am", written by James Brown, performed by Lyn Collins.  It also contains excerpts from "Sport", performed by Lightnin' Rod.
 "Live Now" contains interpolations of "Fantasy", written by Maurice White, Verdine White, and Eddie del Barrio.
 "Just a Moment" contains samples from "Will You Cry", written by Bernard Edwards and Nile Rodgers, performed by Chic.
 "You Know My Style" contains samples from "Jam Master Jay", written by Joseph Simmons, Darryl McDaniels, and Larry Smith, performed by Run-DMC.
 "Suicide Bounce" contains interpolations from "Battle Cry", written by Arthur Baker, Vincent Fuller, and Donald Hawkes.
 "Remember the Times" contains excerpts from "We Do It", written by Russell Stone, performed by Carol Douglas.
 "Getting Married" contains interpolations of "Ike's Mood 1", written by Isaac Hayes.
 "Me & You (Dedicated to Destiny)" contains interpolations from "If This World Were Mine", written by Marvin Gaye.
 "Thief's Theme" contains excerpts from "In-A-Gadda-Da-Vida", written by Doug Ingle, performed by Michael Viner and The Incredible Bongo Band.

Personnel
Performance 
Nas - Rap Vocals (All Tracks), Scarlett's Vocals performed by (tracks 1-07, 1-08), Multiple Instruments (2-03)
John F. Adams - Fender Rhodes Piano (track 2-11), Strings (2-11)
Amerie - Background Vocals (track 1-09)
Kathryn Bostic - Operatic Vocals (track 2-01)
Olu Dara  - Vocals (tracks 2-02, 2-10), Harmonica (2-10), Trumpet (2-10), Lead Guitar (2-10)
 David Downing - Cello (track 2-02)
Doug E. Fresh - Human Beatbox (track 2-04)
Jesse "DJ No Request" Gladstone - Additional Scratches (tracks 1-04, 1-07)
Vincent Henry - Clarinet (tracks 1-03, 2-09), Flute (1-03, 2-09), Baritone Saxophone (2-10), Tenor Saxophone (1-03, 2-09, 2-11), Alto Saxophone (1-03, 2-09, 2-11), Harmonica (2-10), Strings (2-10), Additional Guitar (2-10)
L.E.S. - Drums (tracks 1-02, 1-09), Drum Machine (1-09), All Other Instruments (1-06, 1-10)
Herb Middleton - Keyboards (track 2-12), Bass played by (2-12)
Nut - Keyboards (tracks 1-06, 1-10, 2-07)
Bruce Purse - Trumpet & Flugelhorn (tracks 1-03, 2-09, 2-11)
Quan - Outro Background Vocals (track 2-01)
Salaam Remi - Organ played by (track 1-02), Guitar (1-02, 1-03), Bass played by (1-02, 1-03, 2-02, 2-09, 2-10, 2-11), Fender Rhodes Piano (1-03, 2-09), Drums (1-03, 2-02, 2-10, 2-11), Piano (2-02), Strings (2-09), Synthesizer (2-09), Additional Guitar (2-10), Horns arranged by (2-09), Multiple Instruments (1-07, 1-12, 2-01, 2-06, 2-13)
Makeba Riddick - Background Vocals (track 2-12)
Chucky Thompson -  Piano (track 1-02), Guitar (1-02, 2-09), Drums (1-02, 2-09), Bass played by (1-02, 1-09), Hi-Hat Cymbal (1-09), Percussion (2-09), Multiple Instruments (1-08, 2-08) 
Production & Technical
 Executive Producers: Nasir Jones, Salaam Remi, L.E.S.
 Recording Engineers: Kevin Crouse (tracks 1-01 to 1-12, 2-01 to 2-10, 2-12 to 2-13), Gary Noble (2-11), Carlton Lynn (Additional Music on 1-08)
 Assistant Recording Engineers: Jesse "DJ No Request" Gladstone (tracks 1-02, 1-04, 1-05, 1-08 to 1-11, 2-01, 2-03, 2-04, 2-06, 2-07), Bevin Robinson (1-02, 1-04, 1-05, 1-08 to 1-11, 2-01, 2-03, 2-04, 2-06, 2-07), Colin Miller (1-03, 2-01), Rob Marks (1-03, 1-09, 1-12, 2-02, 2-10 to 2-13), Mark Rinaldi (1-06, 1-07, 2-12), Ryan Evans (1-06, 1-07, 1-09, 2-06, 2-09, 2-12), Mimi (2-01, 2-07), Ben Kane (2-03), Alex Ndionne (2-11)
 Audio Mixing: Kevin Crouse (All Tracks)
 Assistant Audio Mixing: Mark Rinaldi (track 1-12)
 Mastering: Chris Gehringer
 A&R Direction: Mike Brinkley, Timothy "Gov" Ballard, Dino Delvaille
 Album Coordination for Sony Urban Music: Nikki Martin
 Marketing: David Belgrave
 Management: Sara Newkirk
 Legal Representation: Peter Paterno ESQ, Michelle Jubelirer
 Art Direction & Design: Chris Feldmann
 Photography: Danny Clinch
 Imaging: Justin Cohen
 Graphic Artist: Patrick Cahalan
 Prop Stylist: Debora Francis
 Stylist: Tiffany Hassbourne

Charts

Weekly charts

Year-end charts

Certifications

References

External links
 Street's Disciple at Discogs

2004 albums
Nas albums
Albums produced by Buckwild
Albums produced by L.E.S. (record producer)
Albums produced by Salaam Remi
Albums produced by Q-Tip (musician)
Columbia Records albums